Jürgen Werner (born 3 December 1961) is a retired Austrian football midfielder who played for Austria.

References

External links
 
 

1961 births
Austrian footballers
Austria international footballers
Association football midfielders
SK Sturm Graz players
FC Linz players
Living people
People from Wels
Footballers from Upper Austria